Postinflammatory lymphedema is a condition characterized by swelling of the soft tissues in which an excessive amount of lymph has accumulated, and is caused by repeated bacterial infections.

See also 
 Lymphedema
 Skin lesion

References 

Vascular-related cutaneous conditions